The governor of Jharkhand is a nominal head of the Indian state of Jharkhand and permanent representative of president of India. The governor is appointed by the president of India for a five-year term. Raj Bhavan in Ranchi serves as the official residence. Since 18 February 2023, the governor of Jharkhand is C. P. Radhakrishnan.

Powers and functions 
The governor enjoys many different types of powers:

 Executive powers related to administration, appointments and removals,
 Legislative powers related to lawmaking and the state legislature, that is Vidhan Sabha or Vidhan Parishad, and
 Discretionary powers to be carried out according to the discretion of the governor.

Governors of Jharkhand
Following is the list of governors of Jharkhand since its inception on 15 November 2000.

See also
 Governor (India)
 Government of India
 Government of Jharkhand
 Ranchi University

References

External links
http://rajbhavanjharkhand.nic.in/

 
Jharkhand
Governors